is a town located in Saitama Prefecture, Japan. , the town had an estimated population of 17,755 in 8150 households and a population density of 590 persons per km2.

Geography
Ranzan is located in central Saitama Prefecture. The Higashimatsuyama Plateau extends to the central and northern parts of the town/

Surrounding municipalities
Saitama Prefecture
 Fukaya
 Higashimatsuyama
 Kumagaya
 Ogawa
 Namegawa
 Tokigawa
 Hatoyama
 Yorii

Climate
Ranzan has a humid subtropical climate (Köppen Cfa) characterized by warm summers and cool winters with light to no snowfall.  The average annual temperature in Ranzan is 14.0 °C. The average annual rainfall is 1746 mm with September as the wettest month. The temperatures are highest on average in August, at around 25.6 °C, and lowest in January, at around 2.5 °C.

Demographics
Per Japanese census data, the population of Ranzan peaked around the year 2000 and has declined since.

History
The villages of Sugaya and Nanasato were created within Hiki District, Saitama with the establishment of the modern municipalities system on April 1, 1889. The two villages merged on April 15, 1955 as Sugaya village, which was elevated to town status on April 15, 1967, taking the name of Ranzan.

Government
Ranzan has a mayor-council form of government with a directly elected mayor and a unicameral town council of 13 members. Ranzan, together with the towns of Tokigawa, Ogawa and Namekawa, contributes one member to the Saitama Prefectural Assembly. In terms of national politics, the town is part of Saitama 10th district of the lower house of the Diet of Japan.

Economy
The economy of Ranzan is primarily agricultural; however, the town also have a large industrial park. Toppan Printing, Matsuya Foods and Myojo Foods are major employers.

Education
Ranzan has three public elementary schools and two public middle schools operated by the town government. The town does not have a public high school, however, there is one private middle school and one private high school.

Transportation

Railway
 Tōbu Railway - Tōbu Tōjō Line

Highway

Local attractions
Site of Sugaya Yakata, National Historic Site
Site of Sugiyama Castle, National Historic Site

References

External links
Official Website 

Towns in Saitama Prefecture
Hiki District, Saitama
Ranzan, Saitama